David D'Antoni (born 28 January 1979) is an Italian football coach and former player, who played over 150 games at Italian Serie B.

He was most recently in charge as head coach of Serie C club Monterosi.

Playing career
Born in Viterbo, Lazio, D'Antoni played for Ladispoli at Serie D in Lazio region. He then signed by Empoli and made his debut in Serie A on  25 October 1998 against U.C. Sampdoria. He then played at Serie C2 clubs and won promotion with Vis Pesaro. He then played for Salernitana, Cesena, Genoa and Venezia. In January 2005, he joined Frosinone.

Coaching career
In 2014, D'Antoni was named new head coach of Eccellenza amateur club Nuova Sorianese. In 2015, following his club's merger with Monterosi, he was named the head coach of the resulting new club Nuova Monterosi, with whom he won the 2015–16 Eccellenza title and guided them in the successive 2016–17 Serie D campaign.

From 2017 to 2019 he worked as youth coach of Frosinone.

In June 2019 he left Frosinone to return at Monterosi as head coach. Under his tenure, Monterosi won the 2020–21 Serie D league, thus ensuring themselves a historical first promotion to Serie C.

D'Antoni was confirmed in charge of Monterosi for the club's debut Serie C season, but was relieved from his managerial duties on 9 November 2021 following a negative string of results.

Honours

Manager
Monterosi
Serie D: 2020–21 (Group G)
Eccellenza Lazio: 2015–16 (Group A, as Nuova Monterosi)

References

External links

Italian footballers
Italian football managers
Empoli F.C. players
U.S. Alessandria Calcio 1912 players
U.S. Salernitana 1919 players
A.C. Cesena players
Genoa C.F.C. players
Venezia F.C. players
Frosinone Calcio players
Vis Pesaro dal 1898 players
Serie A players
Association football midfielders
People from Viterbo
1979 births
Serie C managers
Living people
Footballers from Lazio
Sportspeople from the Province of Viterbo